Saint Motel (stylized in all caps) is an American indie pop band from Los Angeles, whose music has been described as everything from "dream pop" to "indie prog." The band consists of A/J Jackson (lead vocals, guitar, piano), Aaron Sharp (lead guitar), Dak Lerdamornpong (bass), and Greg Erwin (drums).

Career

2007–2011: ForPlay
The group initially came together while Jackson and Sharp were attending film school in Southern California. The duo later met Lerdamornpong at a sushi restaurant where he worked near campus and Greg who went to a school nearby. The band emphasizes visuals in addition to its music; their 2009 debut EP, ForPlay, included a video for each of the six songs.

2012–2013: Voyeur
The band's first full-length album, Voyeur, debuted at No. 18 on the alt specialty radio charts and six of its eleven songs charted on the Hype Machine Charts. The album was praised by journals ranging from The Washington Post to Daytrotter. KCRW Music Librarian and DJ Eric J. Lawrence wrote, "They have attacked [the debut album] with gusto on Voyeur, adding dynamic touches to their rock-solid core of songwriting," and, "Overall the album is a satisfying package from start to finish."

2014–2015: My Type
The band released the EP My Type with Parlophone on August 17 in the UK. "My Type" climbed the Top 40 charts in many European countries including Italy where it was certified platinum. The band embarked on two European and one US tour in support of the EP and were expected to release the full-length album later in 2015. In December 2014 Saint Motel announced that they had joined the Elektra Records roster. Saint Motel appeared as the musical guest on Jimmy Kimmel Live! on ABC performing the songs "My Type" and "Cold Cold Man." In April 2015, Saint Motel performed during both weekends on the main stage at the 2015 Coachella Valley Music and Arts Festival. They also performed at Piqniq and the 2015 KROQ Weenie Roast.

2016–2018: saintmotelevision
On July 11, 2016, Saint Motel announced saintmotelevision, their second album, would be released on October 21, 2016. The band embarked on a North American tour in support of the album, with Hippo Campus and JR JR as supporting acts. On August 12, Saint Motel released the album's first single, "Move," with an accompanying 360-degree video. The song was featured in the EA Sports video game FIFA 17. In September, in an exclusive with Billboard, they released another song from the album, "You Can Be You." Saint Motel has released 10 virtual reality components, one for each song on the album. This makes Saint Motel the first band to release an entire album with a virtual reality VR experience to accompany every track. Saint Motel has continued to experiment with new technologies, releasing the first-ever augmented reality version of saintmotelevision as well as offering the option to purchase the albums ForPlay and Voyeur with Bitcoin.

2019–present: The Original Motion Picture Soundtrack 
On October 16, 2019, the band released the EP The Original Motion Picture Soundtrack: Part 1, the first of two extended plays consisting of songs from their third album, The Original Motion Picture Soundtrack. On March 16, 2020, the band released the single "A Good Song Never Dies". This was part of the EP The Original Motion Picture Soundtrack: Part 2, the second part of their third album. In 2020, "A Good Song Never Dies" was featured on the soundtrack to the video game MLB The Show 20. On June 25, 2021, the full The Original Motion Picture Soundtrack album was released, containing every song from both EPs, the previously-released single "It's All Happening", and four new songs.

Live shows
Saint Motel has created or performed at a variety of shows, including The Kaleidoscopic Mind Explosion in 3D, Future Fathers Day, The Black & White Show, Make Contact, the 80/35 Music Festival in Des Moines, Iowa, and has toured with bands such as Band of Skulls, and Valentine's Zombie Prom and has toured with bands such as Band of Skulls, Nico Vega, Imagine Dragons, Races, Hockey, Arctic Monkeys, Weezer, and Lights. Saint Motel performed at the 2015 Sanremo Music Festival in Sanremo, Italy, and at the Coachella Valley Music and Arts Festival. On December 12, they performed in Live Out (Monterrey, Mexico). The band opened for Panic! At The Disco on their Death of a Bachelor Tour.

Discography

Studio albums

Extended plays

Singles

Notes

Videography

References

External links

Indie rock musical groups from California
Musical groups from Los Angeles